Goh V Shem  (born Goh Wei Shem, 20 May 1989) is a Malaysian badminton player in the doubles event. He was partnered with Tan Wee Kiong after their outstanding performance at the 2014 Thomas Cup. Together, Goh and Tan won the gold medal for the men's doubles event at the 2014 Commonwealth Games as well as all their matches in the mixed team event, helping Malaysia retain the gold medal for the third consecutive time. They also won the bronze medal at the 2014 Asian Games and the silver medal at the 2016 Rio Olympics, thus making them the second ever Malaysian men's doubles pair to win the silver medal at the Olympic Games 20 years after the feat was achieved by Cheah Soon Kit and Yap Kim Hock in 1996 Atlanta. Goh and Tan are also the fourth Malaysian men's doubles pair to hold the world number 1 ranking after Cheah and Yap followed by Chan Chong Ming and Chew Choon Eng, and later on by Koo Kien Keat and Tan Boon Heong ever since official rankings were kept in the 80s.

Goh is known for his offensive play style and his signature jumping smash. He would stand ready at the back while his partner guards the front, jumping when the opportunity arrives and delivering steep smashes towards the opponent.

Background 
Goh was born in Kuala Lumpur. Later on for good luck he changed his Chinese birth name to one with a different pronunciation, while also changing the spelling of his name in English from Wei Shem to V Shem. The V stands for 'Victory'.

Career 
Goh represented Malaysia at the 2007 BWF World Junior Championships with Ong Jian Guo where they took the bronze medal.

In 2011, Goh took the men's doubles bronze medal with Lim Khim Wah at the 2011 Southeast Asian Games. In late 2012, Goh was scratch partnered with Teo Ee Yi. They won the 2012 Malaysia International. Then for a brief period of time, Goh was once again partnered with Ong Jian Guo. They were semifinalists at the 2012 Korea Grand Prix Gold after being defeated by Ko Sung-hyun and Lee Yong-dae.

In 2013, Goh resumed his partnership with Lim. They became bronze medalists at the Asian Championships and won their first tournament together at the Malaysia Grand Prix Gold after defeating teammates and top seeds, Koo Kien Keat and Tan Boon Heong in the finals. They qualified for the World Championships but were defeated in the second round by compatriots, Hoon Thien How and Tan Wee Kiong. In mid 2013, Goh briefly partnered Teo Kok Siang. They won the bronze medal at the Southeast Asian Games but their partnership was cut short when Teo suffered an injury from a car accident.

2014: Partnership with Tan Wee Kiong 
Goh and Lim's partnership was once again resumed in 2014. They won their first Superseries tournament at the Malaysia Open after defeating China's Chai Biao and Hong Wei in the final. At the Malaysia Grand Prix Gold, they were runners-up after being defeated by Danny Bawa Chrisnanta and Chayut Triyachart of Singapore in the final. Goh played his last tournament with Lim at the 2014 BWF World Championships in September. During the second round match against Lee Sheng-mu and Tsai Chia-hsin of Chinese Taipei, Goh and Lim retired injured as Goh began suffering from backpains mid game.

In May 2014, Goh was scratch partnered with Tan Wee Kiong to play second men's doubles at the 2014 Thomas Cup. They won all four matches that they contested and defeated several highly ranked shuttlers along the way despite this being the first time that the two has played together internationally. Their debut partnership at the Thomas Cup was widely praised. Malaysia made it to the finals for the first time in 12 years but was narrowly defeated by Japan with a score of 2–3.

In August, they represented Malaysia at the 2014 Glasgow Commonwealth Games. They went on to take the gold medal and were the only medalists in the tournament who were not seeded. En route to the gold medal, they defeated top seeds, Chris Adcock and Andrew Ellis of England in the semifinals as well as 3rd seeds, Danny Bawa Chrisnanta and Chayut Triyachart of Singapore in the finals. They also won all five matches they contested in the mixed team event, helping Malaysia secure her third consecutive mixed team gold medal at the Commonwealth Games.

Following the World Championships in September, Goh and Tan had been officially partnered. They represented Malaysia at the 2014 Asian Games where they made it to semifinals but were once again defeated by top seeds, Lee Yong-dae and Yoo Yeon-seong of South Korea. The defeat automatically earned them the bronze medal as there is no bronze medal playoffs in badminton at the Asian Games. En route to the semifinals, they defeated 5th seeds, Lee Sheng-mu and Tsai Chia-hsin of Chinese Taipei in the first round and 3rd seeds, Hiroyuki Endo and Kenichi Hayakawa of Japan in the quarterfinals with a score of 21–16, 21–16.

2015 
In January 2015, Goh and Tan were semifinalists at the Malaysia Masters. In March, they became runners-up to Cai Yun and Lu Kai of China at the Swiss Open with a score of 19–21, 21-14, 17-21. At the 2015 Sudirman Cup in May, Goh and Tan managed to upset the World No.1 pairing of Lee and Yoo in the first group tie against South Korea. They also defeated the pairing of Manu Attri and B. Sumeeth Reddy in the second group tie against India. Malaysia topped Group D and were drawn against South Korea once again in the quarterfinals but failed to advance. They were then runners-up at the Russian Open. At the 2015 BWF World Championships in August, Tan and Goh defeated defending champions Ko Sung-hyun and Shin Baek-cheol of South Korea in the second round but were defeated in the third round. In December, Goh and Tan won the U.S. Grand Prix.

2016: Olympics silver 
In 2016, Goh and Tan won their first title together at the Syed Modi International. They then became beaten semifinalists at the All England Open and the India Superseries. At the Thomas Cup, Goh won three out of his five matches played. Malaysia made it to the semifinals but lost to eventual winners Denmark.

Goh and Tan qualified for their first Olympics at the 2016 Summer Olympics in Rio de Janeiro, Brazil. They won all their matches in the group stage to top group B. They defeated 4th seeds Fu Haifeng and Zhang Nan in the group stage, top seeds Lee Yong-dae and Yoo Yeon-seong in the quarterfinals and 5th seeds Chai Biao and Hong Wei in the semifinals to once again face Fu and Zhang in the finals but this time falling short with a score of 21–16, 11–21, 21–23, taking home silver.

In October, Goh and Tan made it to the semifinals of the Korea Open. In the same year, they won their first Superseries tournament title as a pair at the Denmark Open. In December, Goh and Tan won the Dubai World Superseries Finals. Thus, they have now succeeded the achievements by their seniors, Koo Kien Keat and Tan Boon Heong, who were also among the best men's doubles pair in the long history of Malaysian badminton.

Achievements

Olympic Games 
Men's doubles

Commonwealth Games 
Men's doubles

Asian Games 
Men's doubles

Southeast Asian Games 
Men's doubles

Asian Championships 
Men's doubles

BWF World Junior Championships 
Boys' doubles

BWF World Tour (2 titles, 3 runners-up) 
The BWF World Tour, which was announced on 19 March 2017 and implemented in 2018, is a series of elite badminton tournaments sanctioned by the Badminton World Federation (BWF). The BWF World Tours are divided into levels of World Tour Finals, Super 1000, Super 750, Super 500, Super 300 (part of the HSBC World Tour), and the BWF Tour Super 100.

Men's doubles

BWF Superseries (3 titles) 
The BWF Superseries, which was launched on 14 December 2006 and implemented in 2007, was a series of elite badminton tournaments, sanctioned by the Badminton World Federation (BWF). BWF Superseries levels were Superseries and Superseries Premier. A season of Superseries consisted of twelve tournaments around the world that had been introduced since 2011. Successful players were invited to the Superseries Finals, which were held at the end of each year.

Men's doubles

  BWF Superseries Finals tournament
  BWF Superseries Premier tournament
  BWF Superseries tournament

BWF Grand Prix (3 titles, 3 runners-up) 
The BWF Grand Prix had two levels, the Grand Prix and Grand Prix Gold. It was a series of badminton tournaments sanctioned by the Badminton World Federation (BWF) and played between 2007 and 2017.

Men's doubles

  BWF Grand Prix Gold tournament
  BWF Grand Prix tournament

BWF International Challenge/Series (4 titles) 
Men's doubles

  BWF International Challenge tournament
  BWF International Series tournament

Honours

Honours of Malaysia 
  :
  Member of the Order of the Defender of the Realm (A.M.N.) (2017)

References

External links 
 Profile at Badminton Association of Malaysia
 
 
 

1989 births
Living people
Sportspeople from Kuala Lumpur
Malaysian sportspeople of Chinese descent
Malaysian male badminton players
Badminton players at the 2016 Summer Olympics
Olympic badminton players of Malaysia
Olympic silver medalists for Malaysia
Olympic medalists in badminton
Medalists at the 2016 Summer Olympics
Badminton players at the 2014 Commonwealth Games
Badminton players at the 2018 Commonwealth Games
Commonwealth Games gold medallists for Malaysia
Commonwealth Games silver medallists for Malaysia
Commonwealth Games bronze medallists for Malaysia
Commonwealth Games medallists in badminton
Badminton players at the 2014 Asian Games
Badminton players at the 2018 Asian Games
Asian Games bronze medalists for Malaysia
Asian Games medalists in badminton
Medalists at the 2014 Asian Games
Competitors at the 2011 Southeast Asian Games
Competitors at the 2013 Southeast Asian Games
Competitors at the 2015 Southeast Asian Games
Southeast Asian Games silver medalists for Malaysia
Southeast Asian Games bronze medalists for Malaysia
Southeast Asian Games medalists in badminton
World No. 1 badminton players
Members of the Order of the Defender of the Realm
Medallists at the 2014 Commonwealth Games
Medallists at the 2018 Commonwealth Games